By any means necessary is a phrase used by Jean-Paul Sartre and Malcolm X.

By any means necessary may also refer to:

Music
By Any Means Necessary (Gary Thomas album), 1989
By Any Means Necessary (Pastor Troy album), 2004

Others
"By Any Means Necessary" (Babylon 5), an episode of the television series Babylon 5
NWA By Any Means Necessary, a professional wrestling event
BAMN, or By Any Means Necessary, an American militant left-wing civil rights group

See also
By Any Means (disambiguation)